Devendrakula Velalar is an agricultural community native to the southern, central and western districts of Tamil Nadu, India. The seven subcastes of Devendrakula Velalar are Devendra Kulathar, Kudumbar, Kadaiyar, Kaladi, Pallar, Pannadi and Vathiriyar.

History 
The Devendrakula Velalars traditionally inhabited the fertile wetland area referred to as Marutham in the literary sources of the Sangam landscape. Vendan, also known as Devendra and is identified with Indra, is the god of the Marutham landscape and also one of the chief deities of the Devendrakula Velalars.

Territorial Divisions  
The territorial divisions among the Devendrakula Velalar are Devendra, Chozhiya, Pandiya, Kongan, Eshwaran.
The common honorofic titles used by the Devendrakula Velalars are  "Devendrar", "Mallar", "Kudumbanar", "Vayakkarar", "Mooppanar", "Pannadi", "Mannadi", "Balaganar" and "Kaladi" varying according to their territorial divisions.

Inscriptions 
According to Uthiramerur inscription, the villages in Chola administration were termed as "Kudumbu". An inscription calling them as Devendra Kudumban have been found in Sankara Narayanar Temple at Sankarankoil in  Tenkasi district and "son of the celestial woman" have been found in Ramanathapuram district.

Literature
There are considerable mentions referring the community as agriculturalists and warriors in Pingala Nigandu, Periya Puranam, Kambaramayanam  and Diwakara Nigandu. They are mentioned in Purananooru as involved in agriculture. Agriculture, being the dominant occupation in Sangam society, had gained a status and expertise.

Belief System
The Devendrakula Velalars workship major deities such as Devendra and Mariamman, the Rain Gods, since they are associated with agriculture. They also workship deities such as Kamatchi Amman, Meenakshi Amman, Kaliamman, Isakkiamman and hindu folk deities such as Madasamy and Karuppu Sami. They also workship hindu deities such as Shiva, Vishnu, Ganesha, Parvati and Murugan.

Structure 
In Pandya Nadu region, the headman of Devendrakula Velalars were known as "Kudumbanar" and he would be assisted by "Kaladi" and a messenger called "Variyar" who summons people to attend council-meetings, festivals, marriages and funerals.

In Chola Nadu region, the headman of Devendrakula Velalars were known as " Moopanar" at the village level and each village also has a peon called "Odumpillai". The headman of Devendrakula Velalars were known as "Naatu Moopanar" at the 18 village level.

In Kongu Nadu region, the headman of Devendrakula Velalars were known as "Pattakkarar" at the 18 village level and he is assisted by various subordinate officers and a caste messenger called "Odumpillai". The headman at village level is known as "Pannadi"

Temple festivals

Temple Car Festivals
The Devendrakula Velalar community celebrate and initiate the Temple Car festival and the Raft Chariot of the Patteswarar Temple in Perur, Coimbatore and worn "Parivattam", according to a tradition.

At the Koniamman car festival in Coimbatore, Devendrakula Velalars from Town Hall and Selvapuram are traditionally given the right to start pulling the chariot and worn "Parivattam", according to a tradition dating to the 11th century.

At the Mariamman Teppakulam float festival in Madurai, Devendrakula Velalars from Anupanadi village are traditionally given the right to start pulling the Sri Meenakshi Sundareswarar Temple float, according to a tradition dating to the 17th century.

At the Temple chariot festival at Thenthiruperai, the Devendra Kula Velalars of Thenthiruperai is honored by giving honor to village leaders and Kudumbanars of 15 villages.

At the Srivilliputhur Andal temple in Srivilliputhur, Devendrakula Velalars from Perumalseri and Karisalkulam are traditionally given the right to start pulling the chariot and worn "Parivattam", according to a tradition.

At the Nellaiappar Temple in Tirunelveli, Devendrakula Velalars from Malayalamedu and Thenpathu are traditionally given the right to start pulling the chariot and worn "Parivattam", according to a tradition.

At the Kamakshi Amman Temple in Kanchipuram, Devendrakula Velalars celebrate the "Pushpa Pallakku" festival as a part of Masi Brahmostavam festival in the month of Maasi.

Devendra Pooja
The Devendra Pooja is held at the fourteenth and final day of the Chithirai festival at Meenakshi Sundareshwarar Temple at Madurai in honour of lord Devenrda who is believed to have created the city of Madurai. The Pooja is celebrated in presence of the "Kudumbanar" of Avaniapuram and he is worn "Parivattam" and honoured.

Indra Vizha Festival
The Indra Vizha is conducted at Kamatchi Amman temple at Kallimadai locality near Singanallur  in Coimbatore every year by the Devendrakula Velalar community.

The White Umbrella festival is conducted every year by the Devendrakula Velalars at Rajapalayam every year as a part of Indra Festival.

"Thirukalyanam" Festival
The Thirukalyanam for Muruga and Deivanai is held at Thiruparankundram Murugan Temple in the month of Panguni. The couple visits Devendrakula Velalar Mandapam for visit to the bride's house, since the goddess Deivanai is belieived to be the daughter of Indra  according to Hindu mythology.

The Thirukalyanam for Avinashiyappar and Karunambika is held at Avinasilingeswarar temple at Avinashi in the month of Chithirai at the Devendrakula Velalar Mandapam at Avinashi.

Aravan Festival
The Devendrakula Velalars play a major part in the Aravan Festival in Coimbatore especially in Singanallur, Kurichi and Vellalore and share the adoption and death stage of Aravan, since he is believed to be the son of Arjuna and grandson of Devendra  according to Hindu mythology.

Seedling Planting Festival
According to mythology, the presiding deities, Lord Pateeswarar and Pachainayagi along with Murugan and Vinayagar, of Patteswarar Temple in Perur, Coimbatore, were farmers who took up the task of sowing and cultivating paddies. The Devendrakula Velalar community celebrate Paddy Sowing Season in the name of Chithiramezhi Ponnaer Natru Nadavu Thiruvzha at Patteswarar Temple.

The Devendrakula Velalar community celebrate Paddy Sowing Season in the name of Ponnaer Natru Nadavu Thiruvzha at Makara Nedunkuzhaikathar Temple in Thenthiruperai.

Mariamman Festivals
At the Devendra Kula Mariamman temple at Vellalore in Coimbatore, the yearly temple car festival is celebrated in the month of Chithirai.

At the  Mariamman temple at Maruthur near Kulithalai, the yearly temple car festival is celebrated in the month of Aani.

At the  Mariamman temple at Vaalaiyur near Manachanallur, the yearly temple car festival is celebrated in the month of Vaikasi.

Other Prominent Festivals
The Puliakulam Vinayagar Temple in Coimbatore, which holds the largest Vinayagar statue in entire Asian Continent was opened  by the Devendra Kula Trust in 1982. The Vinayagar Chathurthi celebrations are held every year in the temple.

At Thandi Mariamman temple in Coonoor, the temple car festival and the Sprouting procession is celebrated in the month of Chithirai.

Occupation 
Their traditional occupation is that of cultivation, although by the 1990s large minority of them were employed in government or private services. As of now, many of them work in factories, offices, government jobs and other non-agricultural occupations.

Culture 
In Kongunadu region, the marriage alliances are held within clans such as Devi kulam, Eshwaran kulam, Kandhan kulam, Masaniamman Kulam, Moopan Kulam, Angalamman Kulam, Adi Kaliamman Kulam, Maduraiveeran Kulam, Devan kulam and Kamakshiamman Kulam, which is in lines with the Gotra system in Hinduism. Each clan is associalted with a deity. 

When a person beloning to the community dies in the villages of Perumalseri and Karisalkulam, then on behalf of Srivilliputhur Andal temple administration, a set of a garland, saree, dhoti, rice, turmeric powder and wood is delivered to the Devendrakula Velalar community village administrators for the funeral rites, since the temple car is initiated by them.

Most of their festivals are associated with the seasonal planting of the saplings, harvesting etc. During the harvesting period, the first harvested crops mainly Paddy are offered to the deities for the successful harmonious harvest. Then, each of the functional members gets their share and finally they take home the grains. Since they are very closely connected with agriculture, their belief systems are identified with nature especially the land and water.

Politics
In Tamil Nadu, Devendrakula Velalar make up 11.45% of the state's population. The Devendrakula Velalar, Mutharaiyar and Brahmin play a major role in Srirangam Assembly constituency, as a majority of voters are from these communities.

See also

 Veeran Sundaralingam, an 18th Century General participated in the Polygar Revolt
 Periya Kaladi, an 18th Century General participated in the Polygar Revolt
 Thiagu Vayakkarar, Member of Madras Provincial Legislative Council

References

Sources 

Indian society by state or union territory
Tamil Nadu
Agricultural castes
Tamil culture
Social groups of Tamil Nadu
Indian castes
Devendrakula Velalar